Fernão Nunes, also known as Fernao Nuniz, was a Portuguese-Jewish traveler, chronicler and horse trader who spent three years in Vijayanagara, capital of the Vijayanagara Empire in the time period 1535-1537. His writings have brought to light many interesting details about Vijayanagara at that time, including construction of massive fortification works, watch towers and security walls. From his notes it is known that the expansion of the regal capital limits happened during the rule of King Bukka Raya II and Deva Raya I.

Once Nunes fled the inquisition to Constantinople in the Ottoman Empire, where he openly practiced his Judaism.

Nunes' brother was one Jacob Curiel of Coimbra, alias Duarte Nunes, founder of the Curiel family that would come to greatly influence European trade and diplomacy. Jacob and Fernão frequently wrote letters to each other.

Notes

References
K.A. Nilakanta Sastry, History of South India, From Prehistoric times to fall of Vijayanagar, 1955, OUP, New Delhi (Reprinted 2002) 
Robert Sewell, Fernão Nunes, Domingos Paes, "A forgotten empire: Vijayanagar; a contribution to the history of India" (Includes a translation of "Chronica dos reis de Bisnaga," from Domingos Paes and Fernao Nuniz from 1520 and 1535 respectively), Adamant Media Corporation, 1982, 
Radhakamal Mukerjee, "A history of Indian civilization", Hind Kitabs, 1958 (refere Paes)
H. V. Sreenivasa Murthy, R. Ramakrishnan, "A history of Karnataka, from the earliest times to the present day", S. Chand, 1977

External links
 
  

16th-century explorers
Portuguese explorers
Explorers of Asia
Jewish explorers
Portuguese Renaissance writers
Portuguese travel writers
Vijayanagara Empire
Curiel family
People of Sephardic-Jewish descent
History of Karnataka
16th-century Portuguese people
Year of birth unknown
Year of death unknown

16th-century Jews